This is a list of films produced by the Ollywood film industry based in Bhubaneshwar and Cuttack in 2007:

A-Z

References

2007
Ollywood
2000s in Orissa
2007 in Indian cinema